Priyanshu Rajawat (born 1 February 2002) is an Indian badminton player. He was part of the India team that won the 2022 Thomas Cup.

Achievements

BWF World Tour (1 runner-up) 
The BWF World Tour, which was announced on 19 March 2017 and implemented in 2018, is a series of elite badminton tournaments sanctioned by the Badminton World Federation (BWF). The BWF World Tour is divided into levels of World Tour Finals, Super 1000, Super 750, Super 500, Super 300, and the BWF Tour Super 100.

Men's singles

BWF International Challenge/Series (4 titles, 1 runner-up) 
Men's singles

  BWF International Challenge tournament
  BWF International Series tournament

Performance timeline

National team 
 Senior level

Individual competitions 
 Senior level

References

External links 
 

Living people
2002 births
Indian male badminton players